The Brothers Grimm are two sets of twin supervillains appearing in American comic books published by Marvel Comics.

Publication history
The first appearance of the first Brothers Grimm came in Spider-Woman #3. These were a pair of identical, magically animated mannequins created by doll collector Nathan Dolly (also known as Mister Doll) and his wife Priscilla. During their initial appearances only one was ever seen at a time and the singular identity, Brother Grimm was used instead of their true plural name. After three return appearances in Spider-Woman, they perished in issue #12.

Although the characters were introduced while Marv Wolfman was writing Spider-Woman, their origin and identities were not revealed until Mark Gruenwald's run on the series. Questioned as to whether he had told Gruenwald the characters' origin or Gruenwald had come up with it himself, Wolfman admitted that he could not even remember if the origin he had originally envisioned for the characters was the same as the one ultimately used by Gruenwald, except that "Brother Grimm" actually being two people was his intention from the beginning. Though Wolfman could not remember how the Brothers Grimm were created, he has said he is confident that their visual design must have come from series penciler Carmine Infantino: "I usually gave the artist a concept of what I wanted and then let them have a field day with it. Carmine created brilliant designs in The Flash, so I would certainly have bowed to his expertise."

The second Brothers Grimm appeared in Iron Man #188. They would eventually be thrown together with other lesser known super-villains in a group called the Night Shift.

Fictional character biography

First Pair

Mister Doll, real name Nathan Dolly, was a criminal who could mystically harm a person by harming a doll whose features he could reshape to resemble the victim's. Later in the process of creating the Brothers Grimm dolls, Nathan's consciousness was trapped simultaneously inside both doll mannequins. These mannequins mailed themselves to Nathan's wife Priscilla and transferred their life forces into two life size versions. She named them Jake and William (after the historical Brothers Grimm), and believed them to be her sons, a delusion which they played along with.

The "brothers" had sharply opposed personalities, rarely could come to agreement, and as such pursued separate criminal careers. William, though timid and shy in his civilian personality, was a flamboyant, confrontational jokester in his Brother Grimm guise. After debuting with a robbery of a theatre, he pursued the more lucrative pursuit of stealing from diamond merchants. In contrast, Jake was flirtatious in his civilian identity but cold and dispassionate as Brother Grimm, preferring less publicly visible crimes such as extortion. He was also less skilled with his abilities than William; while William was able to consistently defeat Spider-Woman, Jake was defeated in both his confrontations with her, and William had to free him from prison. William was later hired by Pyrotechnics to capture Spider-Woman, and succeeded.

Priscilla planned to use her occult knowledge to transfer Nathan's mind from the mannequins to a living human body. To this end, Jake abducted Jerry Hunt to use for the body, and William captured Spider-Woman to coerce Magnus the Sorcerer to perform the transfer. Spider-Woman pulled Hunt out of the spell at the last moment, and Nathan's consciousness dispersed.

Second pair

Twin brothers Percy and Barton Grimes are born in Fresno, California. They work as realtors, and while exploring a theatre they own, they find the original Brothers Grimm mannequins. On a whim, they decide to try the costumes on and become gifted with the powers of the original pair. As the Brothers Grimm, they terrorize a restaurant belonging to a business rival, and then battle Iron Man II. Tony Stark deduced their true civilian identities, and the police arrested the brothers.

The Brothers Grimm later became professional criminals, and join the Night Shift, and team with Captain America against the Power Broker and his augmented mutates. With the rest of the Night Shift, the Brothers test Moon Knight to take over as their leader. Alongside the Night Shift, they next battle the West Coast Avengers. The Brothers Grimm are among a large group of supervillains  who attack Hawkeye, Mockingbird, and Trick Shot in an attempt to collect the reward being paid by Crossfire to the first person who gives him Hawkeye's arm.

During the "Acts of Vengeance" storyline, the Brothers Grimm are freed from prison by the Wizard. They battle a cosmic-powered Spider-Man and are defeated. Alongside Graviton, Titania, Trapster, and Goliath IV, the Brothers are hired by the Chameleon to kill Spider-Man. They are then tricked into attacking the Kingpin and defeated by Spider-Man. Alongside Mockingbird and the Werewolf, they help the Shroud defeat a street gang.

The Brothers then briefly rejoin the Night Shift, under the leadership of the new Hangman, and the Night Shift's powers are increased by Satannish. They battle the Avengers West Coast again, but are defeated.

The Brothers are later depicted as prisoners in the Raft, a high security prison for costumed criminals, and escape.

The Brothers Grimm are later hired by the Hood to take advantage of the split in the superhero community caused by the Superhuman Registration Act. They are later captured by Nighthawk and Gargoyle and sent back to jail.

During the "Secret Invasion" storyline, the Brothers Grimm appear as part of the Hood's alliance with super-powered heroes; the grouping is intent on defeating the Skrull invasion force of New York City. They are later seen as part of the Hood's criminal gang that is sent by Norman Osborn to attack the New Avengers.

The Brothers Grimm are seen to be among the new recruits for Camp H.A.M.M.E.R. Tigra beats Percy severely, and leaves a note for his brother reading, "You're next."

The Brothers Grimm were seen during the battle of Camp H.A.M.M.E.R., until the Hood ordered his men, including the Brothers Grimm, to teleport to aid Osborn in Siege of Asgard. After the battle was over, the Brothers Grimm were arrested along with other members of the Hood's gang.

The Brothers Grimm were later recruited by Max Fury to join the Shadow Council's incarnation of the Masters of Evil.

The Brothers Grimm were among the criminals who attempted to fulfill a lucrative contract Daredevil put out on himself, but were quickly defeated by him.

During the "Search for Tony Stark" arc, the Brothers Grimm rejoined Hood's gang and assisted in the attack on Castle Doom.

During the "Spider-Geddon" storyline, the Brothers Grimm are with Night Shift members Dansen Macabre, Digger, Skein, and new member Waxman when they rob a bus until they are attacked by Superior Octopus. Superior Octopus agrees to spare them more pain in exchange that the Night Shift becomes his agents where he will compensate them from his own funds. They agree to the terms and are ordered to return the stolen items. Superior Octopus leaves advising them never to cross him or they won't live long enough to regret it.

The Brothers Grimm later appear as members of Octavia Vermis' Anti-Arach9.

Powers and abilities
Both pairs of Brothers Grimm had powers which were somehow related to the Brothers Grimm mannequins built by Nathan Dolly. Both pairs of Brothers Grimm possess the ability to conjure, with the appearance of sleight of hand, a variety of small novelty items from within their costumes. Each of these items has a unique offensive capability; long strands of nearly unbreakable thread, corrosive filled eggs, pies filled with blackbirds, paralytic "stardust", fast-growing bean seeds, and many others have been used. They could also emit poisonous smoke from their hands. They could fly by means of floating five-pointed "stars" and small cloud banks which are somehow solid enough to stand on.

References

External links
 Brothers Grimm (Barton and Percy Grimes) at Marvel.com
 
 

Characters created by Carmine Infantino
Characters created by Dennis O'Neil
Characters created by Marv Wolfman
Comics characters introduced in 1978
Comics characters introduced in 1984
Fictional characters from California
Fictional real estate brokers
Fresno, California in fiction
Marvel Comics characters who use magic
Marvel Comics supervillains